Daniela Götz (born 23 December 1987) is a German swimmer.

Götz represented Germany in the 2004 and 2008 Summer Olympics. She won a bronze medal at the 2004 Olympics in the 4 × 100 metre medley relay. At the 2008 Olympics, she competed in the 4 × 100 metre freestyle relay.

References

External links
 

German female swimmers
Olympic swimmers of Germany
Living people
1987 births
Olympic bronze medalists for Germany
Swimmers at the 2004 Summer Olympics
Swimmers at the 2008 Summer Olympics
Olympic bronze medalists in swimming
European Aquatics Championships medalists in swimming
Medalists at the 2004 Summer Olympics
German female freestyle swimmers
Sportspeople from Nuremberg